Lake Jefferson may refer to:
Lake Jefferson (Louisiana), in Iberia County, Louisiana
Lake Jefferson (Minnesota), in Le Sueur County, Minnesota
Lake Jefferson (New York), in Sullivan County, New York